Tarkesh or Tarkash or Terkesh, also rendered as Tirkesh, may refer to:
 Tərkeş, Azerbaijan
 Tarkash, East Azerbaijan
 Tarkesh-e Olya, West Azerbaijan Province
 Tarkesh-e Sofla, West Azerbaijan Province
 Tarkesh Coffee Company, West Azerbaijan Province